Chiquola may refer to:

 A previous name for Pawleys Island, South Carolina used by local Native Americans
 Hotel Chiquola, part of the Anderson Downtown Historic District, Anderson, South Carolina
 Chiquola textile mill, operated in Honea Path, South Carolina from 1903 to 2003

See also